Phillip Lucas Ostrowski (born September 23, 1975) is a former American football offensive guard who played two seasons with the San Francisco 49ers of the National Football League (NFL). He was drafted by the 49ers in the fifth round of the 1998 NFL Draft. Ostrowski played college football at Pennsylvania State University and attended Elmer L. Meyers Junior/Senior High School in Wilkes-Barre, Pennsylvania. He has also been a member of the Denver Broncos.

Professional career
Ostrowski was drafted by the San Francisco 49ers with the 151st pick in the 1998 NFL Draft. He signed with the Denver Broncos on April 6, 2001. Ostrowski was released by the Broncos in August 2001.

References

External links
Just Sports Stats
http://www.nfl.com/player/philostrowski/2502369/profile

Living people
1975 births
Players of American football from Pennsylvania
American football offensive guards
Penn State Nittany Lions football players
San Francisco 49ers players
Sportspeople from Wilkes-Barre, Pennsylvania